Leptochoeridae is an extinct  family of basal artiodactyl mammals from the early Eocene to late Oligocene of North America.

Taxonomy
Leptochoeridae was considered a subfamily of Dichobunidae by McKenna and Bell (1997). However, Theodor et al. (2007) treat leptochoerids as a distinct family.

Genera
Ibarus
Laredochoerus
Leptochoerus
Stibarus

References

Eocene even-toed ungulates
Oligocene even-toed ungulates
Eocene first appearances
Chattian extinctions